The 2021 Breeders' Cup Challenge series consisted of 84 horse races that provided the respective winners with an automatic "Win and You're In" Berth in the 2021 Breeders' Cup, held on November 5 and 6. Races were chosen by the Breeders' Cup organization and include key races in the various Breeders' Cup divisions from around the world. The Breeders' Cup organization pays the Breeders' Cup entry fee for the challenge race winners, provided they had been nominated as foals. They also provide travel allowances for out of state competitors

Summary
The 2021 Breeders' Cup Challenge series consisted of 84 races from across the United States and 9 other countries. The 2021 series marked a return to a more normal racing schedule after the 2020 racing calendar was disrupted by the COVID-19 pandemic, and more closely resembles the 2019 series.  Two new races were added to the series: the Suburban Stakes, a qualifier for the Classic, and the Calumet Turf Cup, a qualifier for the Turf. In recognition of the Horseracing Integrity and Safety Act passed in December 2020, the challenge series races did not permit raceday medication.

On October 27, a total of 196 horses were pre-entered in the Breeders' Cup, of which 46 were automatic qualifiers through the challenge races.

Challenge Series races
The following table shows the Breeders' Cup Challenge races for 2021 and respective winners. The status column shows whether the horse was pre-entered.

See also

2021 British Champions Series

References

Breeders' Cup Challenge
Breeders' Cup Challenge series
Breeders' Cup
Breeders' Cup Challenge